Wacław Piotr Rzewuski (1706–1779) was a Polish dramatist and poet as well as a military commander and a Grand Crown Hetman. As a notable nobleman and magnate, Rzewuski held a number of important posts in the administration of the Polish–Lithuanian Commonwealth.

He was a Field Clerk of the Crown since 1732, voivode of Podole Voivodship between 1736 and 1762 (with a gap between 1750 and 1756). In 1735 he received the prestigious Order of the White Eagle. A brave soldier, since 1752 he held the rank of Field Hetman of the Crown. A Castellan of several notable towns, he was an important politician at the Royal Court in Warsaw and was one of the main supporters of the liberum veto during the Diet of 1764, when he became known for his dispute with Szymon Konarski. During the Diet of 1767 (Repnin Sejm) he opposed Prince Nikolai Repnin's - Russia's ambassador to the Commonwealth - interfering in Poland's domestic affairs. In response, he was kidnapped along with his son Seweryn and two other prominent Polish politicians by Russian agents and imprisoned in Kaluga. Upon his release in April 1773 he was promoted for his merits to the rank of Grand Crown Hetman, but resigned the post in November of that year.

Since 1778 he was the Castellan of Kraków and the Voivode of Kraków Voivodship. At the end of his life he was also the Starost of Chełm, Ułany, Romanów, Dolina, Drohobycz and Kruszwica.

As a writer, Rzewuski authored a number of classicist comedies (including the 1759 play Natręt) and several historical tragedies, including a biography of Stanisław Żółkiewski (1758). He also published a number of poems and a poetic handbook On the Science of Poetry (1762). All of his works were published in 1962.

He was the great-grandfather of Ewelina Hańska, wife of French author Honoré de Balzac.

Wife 
Princess Anna Lubomirska (1717 — 1763) was a Polish noblewoman (Polish language: szlachcianka), Grand Hetmaness of the Crown (hetmanowa wielka koronna), and diarist, who was known for her piety.

She married Rzewuski in 1732. 

On September 14, 1748, while she stayed in Vienna, she was received the Order of the Starry Cross, which was the highest Austrian state badge for women at the time.

Publications
Nabożeństwo codzienne świętey pamięci Jeymości pani Anny z Xiążąt Lubomirskich Rzewuskiey Woiewodziny Krakowskiej, Hetmanowey polskiey Koronney, wyięte z książek Jey ręką pisanych (Warszawa, 1792), second edition: Nabożeństwo codzienne wyjęte z książek jej ręką pisanych (Łuck, year unknown)

Children
Wacław Rzewuski had ten children. Five of them survived childhood:
 Stanisław Ferdynand Rzewuski (1737–1786), Great Chorąży of Lithuania
 Józef Rzewuski (1739–1816), general and member of the Sejm  
 Seweryn Rzewuski (1743–1811), Field Hetman of the Crown
 Teresa Karolina Anna Rzewuska (1742–1787), married Karol Stanisław Radziwiłł
 Maria Ludwika Rzewuska (1744–1816), married Jan Mikołaj Chodkiewicz

Notes

1706 births
1779 deaths
People from Lviv Oblast
Waclaw
Ruthenian nobility of the Polish–Lithuanian Commonwealth
Field Crown Hetmans
Great Crown Hetmans
Secular senators of the Polish–Lithuanian Commonwealth
Radom confederates
Polish exiles in the Russian Empire
18th-century Polish–Lithuanian dramatists and playwrights
Polish male dramatists and playwrights
18th-century Polish–Lithuanian poets
Polish male poets
18th-century male writers
Recipients of the Order of the White Eagle (Poland)